Embarrass is an unincorporated community in Coles County, Illinois, United States. It is adjacent to the Embarras River

References

Unincorporated communities in Coles County, Illinois
Unincorporated communities in Illinois